Bukari is a village in Znamensky District of Tambov Oblast, Russia.

References

Rural localities in Tambov Oblast